Living in Harmony may refer to:

 "Living in Harmony" (song), a 1972 song by British singer Cliff Richard
 "Living in Harmony" (The Prisoner), an episode of the British TV series The Prisoner